Hisashi Dam  is a dam in the Ōita Prefecture, Japan, completed in 1979. It is an 
Embankment Dam with the purpose of being an irrigational and industrial water dam.  The dam is 40 metres high and retains 4 800 000 m³ of water over a 263-metre crest length. The volume of the dam is 431 000 m³ and the surface area of lake Hisashi is 370 000 m2.

References 

Dams in Ōita Prefecture
Dams completed in 1979